Oxford Road may be:

 Oxford Road, Hong Kong (牛津道), Kowloon Tong, Hong Kong
 Oxford Road, Reading, Berkshire, England
 Oxford Road, Singapore
 Oxford Road, Manchester, the main southern approach to the city, home of Manchester University
 Manchester Oxford Road railway station
Oxford Road (Ohio), now known as Old Oxford Road
Oxford Road Commonwealth War Graves Commission Cemetery in Belgium
 Oxford Road Halt railway station, a former railway station near Oxford, England
 Oxford Rewley Road railway station, a former railway station in Oxford, England
 Oxford Road, Cowley, Oxfordshire, which leads on to Cowley Road, Oxford
 Oxford Road, Littlemore, Oxfordshire, which leads on to Iffley Road, Oxford

See also
Oxford Street in Westminster, London, formerly known as Oxford Road